Peter Belisle is an American ice hockey coach and former player who was the NCAA Division III coach of the year in 2016.

Career
Belisle was a four-year player with the ice hockey team at Connecticut during one of the program's best stretches. While he was there, the team went 71–25–12, made the conference postseason every year and won its first conference title (the program's only regular season championship as of 2022). After graduating with a degree in business administration, Belisle took a year off before embarking on a coaching career. His first job was as an assistant at Holy Cross, but that stint lasted just a year before he returned to his alma mater in the same role. During his second stay at Storrs, Belisle helped the Huskies transition to Division I and then win the program's first tournament championship in 2000. During this time, Belisle returned to class an earned a Master's degree.

During the 2005–06 season, Massachusetts–Boston had one of the worst performances in the history of college hockey. The Beacons didn't win any of their 26 games and scored a paltry 39 goals over the course of the year. It was the 5th-consecutive year of abysmal play for the Beacons and the team turned to Belisle to give them a fresh start. In his first season behind the bench, UMB won only 5 games but it was still more than they had been able to garner since 2000. By his second year, Belisle was able to get the team up to double-digit wins and then managed his first winning season in 2011. By the mid-teens the Beacons managed to post their first 20-win season in over 35 years. The following season, the program made its first NCAA Tournament appearance. Belisle led the team to the national semifinal that year and was the co-recipient of the Edward Jeremiah Award as the best coach at the Division III level. In the years since, UMB has continued to post winning records but they have yet to return to the national tournament.

Statistics

Regular season and playoffs

Head coaching record

References

External links

Year of birth missing (living people)
American ice hockey coaches
American men's ice hockey players
Living people
Ice hockey people from Rhode Island
People from Manville, Rhode Island
UConn Huskies men's ice hockey players
University of Massachusetts Boston faculty